Clifford Walker (26 June 1919 – 3 December 1992) was an English first-class cricketer, who played five matches for Yorkshire County Cricket Club between 1947 and 1948, and then 121 matches for Hampshire.

Walker was born in Golcar, near Huddersfield, Yorkshire, England, and made his debut for Yorkshire County Cricket Club in 1947.  After playing five games, Walker found himself unable to cement a first team place, and moved to Hampshire after the 1948 season. A product of Slaithwaite C.C., and a sound and reliable batsman who could go in anywhere in the batting order, he had six years at Hampshire before returning to Huddersfield, where he was in the cinema business. He was professional with Golcar C.C. in 1943 and 1944, with Littleborough C.C. in 1945, and he  played both for Brighouse C.C. and Windhill C.C.

In 1959, he was with David Brown Tractors C.C., when they won the Yorkshire Council final.

He played 126 first-class matches for his adopted county until 1954, winning his cap in 1949.  A right-handed batsman and right arm medium pacer, he scored eight centuries, all for Hampshire, with a best of 150 not out.  He scored 5,258 runs at an average of 27.67, with twenty six  fifties and he took 89 catches.  He took fifty three wickets at 49.33, with a best return of 5 for 40.

Walker died in December 1992, in Lindley, Huddersfield.

References

External links
Cricket Archive
Cricinfo

1919 births
1992 deaths
Yorkshire cricketers
Hampshire cricketers
English cricketers
People from Golcar
Cricketers from Yorkshire